Hilarographa leucopyrga is a species of moth of the family Tortricidae. It is found on Java and on Kyushu island in Japan.

The larvae feed on Ardisia species. They feed in the shoots of their host plant.

References

Moths described in 1912
Hilarographini
Moths of Japan